A list of notable Polish politicians of the historical Polish Socialist Party.

A
 Edward Abramowski
 Tomasz Arciszewski

B
 Norbert Barlicki
 Bolesław Bierut
 Józef Biniszkiewicz
 Czesław Bobrowski

C
 Adam Ciołkosz
 Józef Cyrankiewicz

D
 Ignacy Daszyński
 Herman Diamand
 Bolesław Drobner
 Stanisław Dubois

F
 Tytus Filipowicz
 Łukasz Foltyn

G
 Julian Grobelny
 Feliks Gross
 Karol Grossmann

H
 Julian Hochfeld
 Maksymilian Horwitz
 Tadeusz Hołówko

I
 Piotr Ikonowicz

J
 Henryk Jabłoński
 Maria Juszkiewicz

K
 Kazimierz Kelles-Krauz
 Feliks Kon
 Wacław Kostek-Biernacki
 Maria Koszutska
 Halina Krahelska
 Jan Kwapiński

L
 Oskar Lange
 Stanisław Leszczycki
 Herman Lieberman
 Bolesław Limanowski
 Jan Józef Lipski

M
 Zygmunt Marek
 Mieczysław Michałowicz
 Henryk Minkiewicz

N
 Mieczysław Niedziałkowski
 Andrzej Nowicki

O
 Stefan Aleksander Okrzeja
 Edward Osóbka-Morawski

P
 Antoni Pająk
 Kazimierz Pietkiewicz
 Józef Pinior
 Józef Piłsudski
 Aleksander Prystor
 Adam Próchnik
 Kazimierz Pużak

R
 Tadeusz Rechniewski

S
 Kazimierz Sosnkowski
 Władysław Studnicki
 Aleksander Sulkiewicz
 Walery Sławek
 Henryk Sławik

T
 Tadeusz Tomaszewski
 Franciszek Trąbalski

U
 Alfred Urbański

W
 Walery Antoni Wróblewski
 Wanda Wasilewska
 Leon Wasilewski
 Zofia Wasilkowska
 Kazimierz Wojciechowski
 Stanisław Wojciechowski

Z
 Zygmunt Zaremba
 Antoni Zdanowski

Ł
 Augustyn Łukosz

Ś
 Artur Śliwiński

Ż
 Zygmunt Żuławski

 
Socialist